Outlawed Guns is a 1935 American Western film directed by Ray Taylor and written by John T. Neville. The film stars Buck Jones, Ruth Channing, Frank McGlynn, Sr., Roy D'Arcy, Pat J. O'Brien and Joseph W. Girard. The film was released on July 29, 1935, by Universal Pictures.

Plot

Cast 
Buck Jones as Buck Rivers
Ruth Channing as Ruth Ellsworth
Frank McGlynn, Sr. as Jingle
Roy D'Arcy as Jack Keeler
Pat J. O'Brien as Babe Rivers
Joseph W. Girard as Sheriff Rocky Ellsworth
Joan Gale as Marge Ellsworth
Lee Shumway as Henchman Blacky Bates
Charles King as Henchman Frank Davilla 
Jack Rockwell as Deputy Harvey Daniels
Silver as Silver

References

External links 
 

1935 films
American Western (genre) films
1935 Western (genre) films
Universal Pictures films
Films directed by Ray Taylor
American black-and-white films
Revisionist Western (genre) films
1930s English-language films
1930s American films